Live at Montreux is an album by American jazz pianist Andrew Hill, a live album of a solo performance recorded at the Montreux Jazz Festival in 1975 and released on the Freedom label. The album features three of Hill's original compositions and one interpretation of a Duke Ellington tune.

Reception

The Allmusic review by Ken Dryden awarded the album 4 stars and stated "Andrew Hill hadn't been recording much for a few years by the time of this 1975 concert at the Montreux Jazz Festival, and one wonders why while listening to this very entertaining solo performance".

Track listing
All compositions by Andrew Hill except as indicated
 "Snake Hip Waltz" - 11:15  
 "Nefertiti" [mistitled "Nefertisis"] - 10:16  
 "Relativity" - 17:56  
 "Come Sunday" (Duke Ellington) - 4:50  
Recorded at the Montreux Jazz Festival, Montreux, Switzerland on July 20, 1975

Personnel
 Andrew Hill - piano

References

Freedom Records live albums
Andrew Hill live albums
1975 live albums
Solo piano jazz albums